George Irvine may refer to:

George Irvine (politician) (1826–1897), Canadian politician
George Irvine (basketball) (1948–2017), American basketball player and coach
George Irvine (diver), see William Hogarth Main

See also
George Irving (disambiguation)
George Irwin (disambiguation)